Mieszkowo may refer to the following places:
Mieszkowo, Lubusz Voivodeship (west Poland)
Mieszkowo, Masovian Voivodeship (east-central Poland)
Mieszkowo, West Pomeranian Voivodeship (north-west Poland)